Mochlus brevicaudis is a species of skink. It is found in Guinea, Ivory Coast, and Ghana, possibly extending into Togo. It is a semi-fossorial species inhabiting moist savanna.

References

Mochlus
Skinks of Africa
Reptiles of West Africa
Reptiles described in 1985
Taxa named by Robert Barbault
Taxa named by Alice Georgie Cruickshank Grandison
Taxa named by Allen Eddy Greer